With nearly 250,000 Buddhists, Brazil is home to the third-largest Buddhist population in the Americas, after the United States and Canada. Buddhism in Brazil consists of practitioners from various Buddhist traditions and schools. A number of Buddhist organisations and groups are also active in Brazil, with nearly 150 temples spread across the states.

Mahayana Buddhism

Japanese Buddhist denominations

Buddhism was introduced to Brazil due to the immigration of Japanese in the early 20th century. Thus, Japanese schools and sects of Buddhism, such as Soto Zen, Nichiren Honmon Butsuryu Shu, Jodo Shinshu (which district of the Nishi Hongan-ji is known as South America Hongwanji Mission) and Soka Gakkai have a strong presence in Brazil. Despite being the most expressive in Brazil, these schools face a number of challenges which limit their influence and outreach. One of those challenges is the mismatch of goals and expectations between the more traditional, Japanese-born people and the native Brazilians alongside those of Japanese descent.

Although the Japanese contributed to the introduction of Buddhism to Brazil, adherence to Buddhism is not particularly widespread among the descendants of Japanese immigrants, who were largely converted to Roman Catholicism due to assimilation. Those who practice and identify with Buddhism tend to display a wide variety of stances regarding their relationships to the ethnicity and the religious tradition.  To various degrees most of them attempt to simultaneously meld with local Brazilian culture according to their personal preferences. Most such schools are attempting to reach out to Brazilians not of Japanese descent, however often facing considerable internal resistance in the process.

Other Japanese traditions present in Brazil include Shingon, Tendai, Nichiren-shū and Nichiren Shōshū schools, albeit in somewhat modest numbers. Recent years also saw a growth of interest in the practice Zen variants from Korea and Vietnam in Brazil.

Other Mahayana schools

The Chinese Chan tradition of Mahayana Buddhism is centered on the city of Cotia's Zu Lai Temple and its companion Buddhist University in São Paulo State, both of which were opened in 2003 by Fo Guang Shan Order from Taiwan. The temple, near the city of São Paulo, is the largest temple in Latin America, and was built using funds raised from American Buddhist organisations and donors.

The Fo Guang Shan Temple in the city of Olinda, in the northeastern state of Pernambuco, also belongs to the Mahayana tradition.

The Vietnamese Zen school of Thich Nhat Hanh maintains temples and sangha in the cities of São Paulo and Rio de Janeiro.

Theravada Buddhism

The Theravada tradition's presence in Brazil was started by those who created the Brazil Buddhist Society. It was initially presented with a generalist non-sectarian approach to Buddhism, it evolved into a more Theravada-aligned society drawing teachings from the Pāli Canon of the Tripitaka and to other teachings and practices of the Theravada tradition.
Since the 1970s it has maintained simple installations built with voluntary work which have hosted visiting monks from Sri Lanka and other Theravada countries. In 1989, the Nalanda Buddhist Centre  was established. It maintains affiliated groups in Rio de Janeiro, Belo Horizonte, São Paulo and Curitiba, and has invited many international teachers through the years.
Today, there's a monastery affiliated to Ajahn Chah lineage, under guidance of Ajahn Mudito, whose name is Suddhavāri monastery, located in São Lourenço, Minas Gerais.

Vajrayana Buddhism

All four major schools of Vajrayana Buddhism, Nyingma, Gelug, Sakya and Kagyu schools, maintain active centers in Brazil. Chagdud Tulku Rinpoche relocated the headquarters of his international organization to Três Coroas in Rio Grande do Sul State where he spent the last few years of his life. The 14th Dalai Lama visited Brazil in 2006.

Contemporary Buddhism

Although Brazil remains a largely Christian country, Buddhism has a growing presence in Brazil. There is considerable online activity and dialogue amongst Brazilian Buddhists, with a number of websites and online groups; there are, for example, Facebook groups dedicated for discussion and clarifying doubts about Buddhism and Buddhist teachings.

The activities of Buddhist groups are however a bit restricted due to the linguistic geography of Brazil - since it is a non-Spanish speaking country in Latin America. This limits the cross-boundary activities typical of the Buddhist organisations active in other countries.

The State government of Espírito Santo has implemented a special training programme for military police to attend zen courses at the Mosteiro Zen Morro da Vargem.

References

Bibliography
 Moreira da Rocha, Cristina  (2000). Zen Buddhism in Brazil: Japanese or Brazilian?, Journal of Global Buddhism 1, 31-55
 Moreira da Rocha, Cristina  (2006). Zen in Brazil: The Quest for Cosmopolitan Modernity, Honolulu: University of Hawaiʻi Press

External links 
 Suddhavāri Monastery Thai Forest Tradition monastery
 Dharmanet BR One of the main Brazilian Buddhism websites
 Official Brazilian HBS site - Honmon Butsuryu Shu is a Nichiren Buddhism school that has significant Brazilian presence
 Official Brazilian NKT site
 Chagdud Gonpa Brazil - a network of Nyingma centers in Brazil
 Brazil Buddhist Society
 Nalanda Brazilian Theravada Buddhist Community
 Official BSGI site - Brazilian representative of the Soka Gakkai International
 Zu Lai Temple - of the Chinese Chan tradition, located in Cotia, São Paulo
 Busshinji Temple - Head temple of Soto Zen sect for South America
 Buddhactivity Dharma Centres database
 Centres in Brazil practicing in the tradition of Thich Nhat Hanh

 
Brazil
Religion in Brazil
Buddhism in South America